is a Japanese pharmacist, male fashion model, tarento, and actor. He is a member of Japan Mensa. He is a member of Iwanaga Kyōdai.

Biography
Iwanaga was born in Sasebo, Nagasaki. He graduated from Fukuoka University School of Pharmaceutical Sciences. Iwanaga also graduated from Keio University Graduate School of Pharmaceutical Sciences.

He worked as an exclusive model of the magazine Men's Non-no from July 2009, he also worked as a pharmacist since April 2012. Together with the same magazine models, Tomokane Osugi, and Hirokazu Akatsuka Iwanaga participated as a voice actor in the released film One Piece Film: Z in December 2012.

After graduating from the same programme, Iwanaga appeared on the Yakyū-ken Corner of the broadcast Mecha-Mecha Iketeru! on 24 August the same year and became a topic on the internet. In November of the same year, he received membership of Japan Mensa, an organization of people with IQ with the world's top 2%. Broadcast on the same day of the same month Iwanaga appeared as a member of the "Ikemen Intelli Army" on Otameshika'! & Q-sama!! Gattai 2-jikan SP.

March 2014 After Men's Non-no exclusive model graduation (magazine publication up to the June issue) appears as a free model Baila, JJ, and other women's magazines. Iwanaga appeared in several advertisements including the Walkman F series. In addition, he participated in the writing of the medical part of Chapter 2 of "Science and Technology Explaining in English" written by Ichizo Ueda and Toshiko Ueda. His fields to be active are diverse.

On March 31, 2022, Iwanaga left his talent agency, LesPros Entertainment.

Personal life, favourites
He has no full-fledged study abroad experience, he mastered self-taught English. Iwanaga speaks fluent English.
Studying is his hobby. Iwanaga had acquired many licenses and qualifications.
In the past, he was in charge of lyrics, music composition, vocals, guitar in an amateur band.
Iwanaga loves space. He received a JAXA astronaut qualification test and received an all triple A rating.
As long as Iwanaga uses the word "One Piece addict" he heard that he liked the Weekly Shōnen Jump serial manga One Piece. He was raised to one person to respect the same comic author Eiichiro Oda. Iwanaga also collects overseas manga. One Piece Film: Z talks about the impression of participating in a voice actor and a commemoration event One Piece Award held before the film release on his official blog. In addition, the blog also shows full-fledged illustrations Iwanaga drawn. His favourite manga other than One Piece are Doraemon, Slam Dunk, Black Jack and other Osamu Tezuka manga, Tobaku Haō-den Rei and other Nobuyuki Fukumoto manga, Case Closed, Basara, and Kare Kano.
His Men's Non-no exclusive model period belongs to the Run department, participated in the December 2011 reggae marathon held in Jamaica. Iwanaga belong to the football club when he was in elementary school, and belong to basketball club after middle school. In addition, he was good at general sports other than baseball and baseball fist such as kendo, swimming etc.
Iwanaga's favourite celebrities and artists are Rahmens, Airi Taira, B'z, Mr. Children, L'Arc-en-Ciel, Vamps, Radwimps, Masaharu Fukuyama, Hikaru Utada, Linkin Park, Eric Clapton, and Ayumi Hamasaki.
His favourite food are strawberry sandwich and stew.
Iwanaga's favourite character is Cheburashka.
When he was a child, he learned the piano, the abacus, swimming, calligraphy, boy scouting.
Along with Tatsuya Iwanaga, whom he has the same family name and similar names, formed a unit called Iwanaga Kyōdai and is active on YouTube programmes, Instagram etc.
On May 18, 2022, Iwanaga finished Liberal Arts exam.

Filmography

TV programmes

TV dramas

Films

Stage

Advertisements

Internet programmes

Internet contents

DVD & Blu-ray

Video games

Magazines

Fashion shows

Discography

Internet singles

References

External links
  (Scheduled to be closed on July 31, 2022.)
 
 

Japanese male models
Japanese pharmacists
People from Sasebo
Actors from Nagasaki Prefecture
Models from Nagasaki Prefecture
1986 births
Living people
Japanese male actors
Mensans